The Edge of Power is a 1987 Australian film directed by Henri Safran.

References

External links

Australian thriller drama films
1987 films
Films directed by Henri Safran
1980s English-language films
1980s Australian films